Express Yourself Clearly is the debut studio album from American pop and R&B group E.Y.C. It was released in 1994 in Europe, Australia, Japan and the US The album charted at No. 14 on the UK Albums Chart. and featured the top 40 hits "Feelin' Alright", "The Way You Work It", "Black Book "Number One" and "One More Chance" The track "Get Some" also features Boo-Yaa T.R.I.B.E., the song was E.Y.C.'s first single in the US before the band had success in Europe with their first international single "Feelin' Alright". 

The US version of the album had a slightly different track list to cater for the US market including the track "Straight Mackin'" which replaced "Number One" ("Straight Mackin'" was the B-Side to the international single "Number One"). "The Way You Work It" was also remixed for the US album completely different from the international releases. The US version of the album also had a completely different artwork to cater to the US market.

A limited edition 2 disc version was also released in the UK featuring additional tracks.

Track listing

UK Version

 Feelin' Alright – 4:11
 Nice and Slow – 4:24
 Black Book – 4:08
 Remembering You Girl – 4:41
 One More Chance – 4:03
 The Way You Work It – 2:57
 Baby Don't You Know – 4:53
 Number One – 3:39
 You Are My Happiness - 4:03
 Swing My Way (Demo) - 4:25
 Get Some - 4:22

Additional tracks on 2 disc version

 Feelin' Alright (Show Mix) - 3:21
 The Way You Work It (T. Reck Mix) - 4:32
 EYC-Ya - 2:04

US Version

 Feelin' Alright – 4:11
 Nice and Slow – 4:24
 Black Book – 4:08
 Remembering You Girl – 4:41
 One More Chance – 4:03
 The Way You Work It – 2:57
 Baby Don't You Know – 4:53
 Swing My Way – 3:39
 You Are My Happiness - 4:03
 Straight Mackin' - 4:03
 Get Some - 4:22

Charts

References 

MCA Records albums
1994 debut albums
Contemporary R&B albums by American artists